The Honor of an Outlaw is a 1917 American short silent Western film featuring Harry Carey.

Cast
 Harry Carey
 Claire Du Brey
 T. D. Crittenden
 Fred Kelsey (as Fred A. Kelsey)
 Jack Leonard

See also
 Harry Carey filmography

External links
 

1917 films
1917 short films
American silent short films
American black-and-white films
1917 Western (genre) films
Films directed by Fred Kelsey
Silent American Western (genre) films
1910s American films
1910s English-language films